Elections to West Sussex County Council were held on 7 June 2001, alongside a parliamentary general election. The whole council was up for election, and the Conservative Party remained in control of the council. Turnout across the county ranged from 42.7% in Broadfield to 69.6% in Midhurst, with the county average standing at 60.8%.

Election Result

|}

Results by electoral division

Adur

Arun

Chichester

Crawley

Horsham

Mid Sussex

Worthing

References

West Sussex County Council - Result of Poll - 7 June 2001
Adur District Council - West Sussex County Council Election Results 2001
Mid Sussex District Council - County Council June 2001
West Sussex County Elections 2001 - Lower Adur Valley Results

2001 English local elections
2001
2000s in West Sussex
June 2001 events in the United Kingdom